1999 was designated as the International Year of Older Persons.

Events

January
 January 1 – The euro currency is established and the European Central Bank assumes its full powers.
 January 3 – The Mars Polar Lander is launched by NASA.
 January 25 – The 6.2  Armenia, Colombia earthquake hits western Colombia, killing at least 1,900.

February
 February 7 – Abdullah II inherits the throne of Jordan, following the death of his father King Hussein.
 February 11 – Pluto moves along its eccentric orbit further from the Sun than Neptune. It had been nearer than Neptune since 1979, and will become again in 2231.
 February 12 – U.S. President Bill Clinton is acquitted in impeachment proceedings in the United States Senate.
 February 16
 In Uzbekistan, an apparent assassination attempt against President Islam Karimov takes place at government headquarters.
 Across Europe, Kurdish rebels take over embassies and hold hostages after Turkey arrests one of their rebel leaders.
 February 23
 Kurdish rebel leader Abdullah Öcalan is charged with treason in Ankara, Turkey.
 1999 Galtür avalanche: An avalanche destroys the village of Galtür, Austria, killing 31.
 February 27 – While trying to circumnavigate the world in a hot air balloon, Colin Prescot and Andy Elson set a new endurance record after being aloft for 233 hours and 55 minutes.

March
 March 1
 One of four bombs detonated in Lusaka, Zambia, destroys the Angolan Embassy.
 Rwandan Hutu rebels kill and dismember eight foreign tourists at the Buhoma homestead, Uganda.
 The Convention on the Prohibition of Anti-Personnel Mines comes into force.
 March 12 – Former Warsaw Pact members Hungary, Poland, and the Czech Republic join NATO.
 March 15 – The Santer Commission of the EU resigns over allegations of corruption.
 March 21
 Bertrand Piccard and Brian Jones become the first to circumnavigate the Earth in a hot air balloon.
 The 71st Academy Awards are held at the Dorothy Chandler Pavilion in Los Angeles with Shakespeare in Love winning Best Picture.
 March 24
 NATO launches air strikes against the Federal Republic of Yugoslavia, marking the first time NATO has attacked a sovereign state.
 A fire in the Mont Blanc Tunnel kills 39 people, closing the tunnel for nearly three years.
 March 26 – The Melissa worm attacks the Internet.
 March 27 – Kosovo War: A U.S. F-117 Nighthawk is shot down by Yugoslav forces.
 March 29 – For the first time, the Dow Jones Industrial Average closes above the 10,000 mark, at 10,006.78.

April
 April 1 – Nunavut, an Inuit homeland, is created from the eastern portion of the Northwest Territories to become Canada's third territory.
 April 5
 Two Libyans suspected of bringing down Pan Am Flight 103 in 1988 are handed over to Scottish authorities for eventual trial in the Netherlands. The United Nations suspends sanctions against Libya.
 In Laramie, Wyoming, Russell Henderson pleads guilty to kidnapping and felony murder, in order to avoid a possible death penalty conviction for the apparent hate crime killing of Matthew Shepard.
 April 7 – Kosovo War: Kosovo's main border crossings are closed by Yugoslav forces to prevent Kosovar Albanians from leaving.
 April 9 – Ibrahim Baré Maïnassara, president of Niger, is assassinated.
 April 14 – Kosovo War: NATO warplanes repeatedly bomb ethnic Albanian refugee convoys for 2 hours over a 12-mile stretch of road, after mistaking them for Yugoslav military trucks, between Đakovica and Dečani in western Kosovo, killing at least 73 refugees.
 April 20 – Columbine High School massacre: Two Littleton, Colorado, teenagers, Eric Harris and Dylan Klebold, open fire on their teachers and classmates, killing 12 students and 1 teacher, and then themselves.
 April 24 – Namibian Economic Society is founded.
 April 26
 Sultan Salahuddin of Selangor becomes the 11th Yang di-Pertuan Agong of Malaysia.
 British TV presenter Jill Dando, 37, is shot dead on the doorstep of her home in Fulham, London.
 April 30 – Cambodia joins the Association of Southeast Asian Nations (ASEAN), bringing the total members to 10.

May
 May 3 – 1999 Oklahoma tornado outbreak: a devastating tornado, rated F5 on the Fujita scale, hits southern and eastern Oklahoma City metropolitan area, killing 36 people (and 5 indirectly) and producing the highest winds recorded on Earth: .
 May 7
 Kosovo War: in the Federal Republic of Yugoslavia, three Chinese embassy workers are killed and twenty others wounded when a NATO B-2 aircraft bombs the Chinese Embassy in Belgrade.
 In Guinea-Bissau, President João Bernardo Vieira is ousted in a military coup.
 May 12 – David Steel becomes the first Presiding Officer (Speaker) of the modern Scottish Parliament.
 May 13 – Carlo Azeglio Ciampi is elected President of Italy.
 May 17 – Ehud Barak is elected prime minister of Israel.
 May 26
 The Indian Air Force launches an attack on intruding Pakistan Army troops and mujahideen militants in Kashmir.
 The 1999 UEFA Champions League Final takes place at the Camp Nou Stadium, Barcelona, in which the English side Manchester United defeats the German side Bayern Munich 2–1.
 May 27 – The International Criminal Tribunal for the former Yugoslavia in The Hague, Netherlands indicts Slobodan Milošević and four others for war crimes and crimes against humanity committed in Kosovo.
 May 28
 Two Swedish police officers are wounded by bank robbers armed with automatic firearms, and later executed with their own service pistols in Malexander, Sweden.
 After 22 years of restoration work, Leonardo da Vinci's The Last Supper is placed back on display in Milan, Italy.
 May 29 – Nigeria terminates military rule, and the Fourth Nigerian Republic is established with Olusegun Obasanjo as president.

June
 June 1 – Napster, a music downloading service, is created; it would later inspire other file-sharing sites such as The Pirate Bay, LimeWire, Gnutella, Kazaa, Morpheus, BearShare, and uTorrent 1999-2010 period which some called the "Second Golden Age of Piracy".
 June 2 – The King of Bhutan allows television transmissions to commence in the Kingdom for the first time, coinciding with the King's Silver Jubilee.
 June 5 – The Islamic Salvation Army, the armed wing of the Islamic Salvation Front, agrees in principle to disband in Algeria.
 June 8 – The government of Colombia announces it will include the estimated value of the country's illegal drug crops, exceeding half a billion US dollars, in its gross national product.
 June 9 – Kosovo War: Yugoslavia and NATO sign a peace treaty to end their hostilities.
 June 10 – Kosovo War: NATO suspends its air strikes after Slobodan Milošević agrees to withdraw Yugoslav forces from Kosovo.
 June 12 – Kosovo War: Operation Joint Guardian/Operation Agricola begins: NATO-led United Nations peacekeeping forces KFOR enter Kosovo, Yugoslavia.
 June 16 – Thabo Mbeki is inaugurated as the second president of South Africa, marking the first peaceful transfer of executive power in the country's post-democratization history.
 June 18 – The J18 international anti-globalization protests are organized in dozens of cities around the world, some of which led to riots.
 June 19 – Turin, Italy, is awarded the 2006 Winter Olympics.
 June 24 – Kosovo War: NATO marines shoot three gunmen in Kosovo, Yugoslavia after being attacked by the latter, killing one of them and injuring the other two.
 June 25 – Bosnia and Herzegovina gets a new national anthem.
 June 30 – Twenty-three people die in a fire at the Sealand Youth Training Center in South Korea.

July
 July 1 – Europol (short for European Police Office) the European Union's criminal intelligence agency becomes fully operational.
July 7 – In Rome, Hicham El Guerrouj runs the fastest mile ever recorded, at 3:43.13.
 July 10 – American soccer player Brandi Chastain scores the game winning penalty kick against China in the final of the FIFA Women's World Cup.
 July 11 – India recaptures Kargil, forcing the Pakistani army to retreat. India announces victory, ending the 2-month conflict.
 July 20
 Mercury program: Liberty Bell 7 – piloted by Gus Grissom in 1961 – is raised from the Atlantic Ocean.
 Falun Gong is banned in the People's Republic of China under Jiang Zemin.
 July 23
 NASA's Chandra X-ray Observatory is launched.
 Mohammed VI of Morocco becomes king upon the death of his father Hassan II.
Fourteen Kosovar Serb villagers are killed by ethnic Albanian gunmen in the village of Staro Gračko.
 July 27 – Twenty-one people die in a canyoning disaster at the Saxetenbach Gorge near Interlaken, Switzerland.
 July 31 – NASA intentionally crashes the Lunar Prospector spacecraft into the Moon, thus ending its mission to detect frozen water on the lunar surface.

August
 August 7 – Hundreds of Chechen guerrillas invade the Russian republic of Dagestan, triggering a short war.
 August 10 – The Atlantique incident occurs as an intruding Pakistan Navy plane is shot down in India, sparking tensions between the two nations, coming just a month after the end of the Kargil War.
 August 11 – A total solar eclipse is seen in Europe and Asia.
 August 16 – State Duma approved Putin as Prime Minister
 August 17 – The 7.6  İzmit earthquake shakes northwestern Turkey with a maximum Mercalli intensity of IX (Violent), leaving more than 17,000 dead and around 50,000 injured.
 August 19 – In Belgrade, tens of thousands of Yugoslavs rally to demand the resignation of Yugoslav President Slobodan Milošević.
 August 26 – The Second Chechen War begins
 August 30 – East Timor votes for independence from Indonesia (which had invaded and occupied it since 1975) in a referendum.

September
 September 3 – 1999 Ontario Highway 401 crash occurs, involving 87 vehicles and killing 8.
 September 7 – The 6.0  Athens earthquake hits with a maximum Mercalli intensity of IX (Violent), killing 143, injuring 800–1,600, and leaving 50,000 homeless.
 September 8 – The first of a series of Russian apartment bombings occurs. Subsequent bombings occur on September 13 and 16, while a bombing on September 22 fails.
 September 12 – Under international pressure to allow an international peacekeeping force, Indonesian president BJ Habibie announces that he will do so.
 September 14 – Kiribati, Nauru and Tonga join the United Nations.
 September 20 – Start of the Greek stock market crash of 1999.
 September 21 – The 921 earthquake, also known as the Jiji earthquake (magnitude 7.6 on the Richter scale), kills about 2,400 people in Taiwan.

October
 October
 Conacami, Peruvian indigenous rights organization is founded.
 NASA loses one of its probes, the Mars Climate Orbiter.
 October 1 – Shanghai Pudong International Airport opens in China, taking over all international flights from Hongqiao.
 October 5 – Thirty-one people die in the Ladbroke Grove rail crash, west of London, England.
 October 12 – Pakistani Prime Minister Nawaz Sharif attempts to dismiss Army Chief General Pervez Musharraf, who is out of the country. The generals lead a coup d'état, ousting Sharif's administration, and Musharraf takes control of the government.
 October 27 – Gunmen open fire in the Armenian Parliament, killing Prime Minister Vazgen Sargsyan, Parliament Chairman Karen Demirchyan, and six other members.
 October 29 – A super cyclonic storm impacts Orissa, India, killing approximately 10,000 people.
 October 30 – : A pub catches fire in Inchon, South Korea, killing 56 people.
 October 31
 EgyptAir Flight 990, travelling from New York City to Cairo, crashes off the coast of Nantucket, Massachusetts, killing all 217 on board.
 Roman Catholic Church and several Lutheran Church leaders sign the Joint Declaration on the Doctrine of Justification, attempting to resolve a centuries-old doctrinal dispute over the nature of faith and salvation.

November
 November 6 – Australians defeat a referendum proposing the replacement of the Queen and the Governor General with a President to make Australia a republic.
 November 12 – The 7.2  Düzce earthquake shakes northwestern Turkey with a maximum Mercalli intensity of IX (Violent). At least 845 people are killed and almost 5,000 are injured.
 November 20 – China launches the first Shenzhou spacecraft.
 November 23 – The National Assembly of Kuwait revokes a 1985 law that granted women's suffrage.
 November 26 – The 7.5  Ambrym earthquake shakes Vanuatu and a destructive tsunami follows, killing 10 and injuring 40.
 November 27 – The centre-left Labour Party takes control of the New Zealand government, with leader Helen Clark becoming the second female Prime Minister in New Zealand's history.

December
 December 3
 After rowing for 81 days and 5,486 kilometers (2,962 nautical miles), Tori Murden becomes the first woman to cross the Atlantic Ocean by rowboat alone, when she reaches Guadeloupe from the Canary Islands.
 NASA loses radio contact with the Mars Polar Lander, moments before the spacecraft enters the Martian atmosphere.
 December 5 – Bolivian municipal elections, the first election contested by Evo Morales' Movement for Socialism.
 December 18 – NASA launches the Terra platform into orbit, carrying five Earth Observation instruments, including ASTER, CERES, MISR, MODIS and MOPITT.
 December 20 – The sovereignty of Macau is transferred from the Portuguese Republic to the People's Republic of China after 442 years of Portuguese settlement.
 December 26 – Cyclone Lothar kills 140 people as it crossed France, southern Germany, and Switzerland.
 December 27 – A day after Cyclone Lothar, Cyclone Martin causes additional damage throughout France, Spain, Switzerland and Italy, including an emergency due to flooding at the Blayais Nuclear Power Plant.
 December 31 – Boris Yeltsin resigns as president of Russia, leaving Prime Minister Vladimir Putin as the acting president.

Births

January–February

 January 1 
 Gianluca Scamacca, Italian soccer player
 Diamond White, American actress, voice artist, and singer
 January 3 
 Amaia Romero, Spanish singer 
 Georgia Stanway, English footballer
 January 4
 Daniel Arzani, Iranian born-Australian soccer player
 Nico Hischier, Swiss ice hockey player
 Collin Sexton, American basketball player
 January 6 
 Polo G, American rapper
 Elena Radionova, Russian figure skater
 January 8 – Damiano David, Italian singer-songwriter
 January 9 – Li Zhuhao, Chinese swimmer
 January 12
 Nicolás Schiappacasse, Uruguayan footballer
 Xavier Tillman, American basketball player
 January 18 – Karan Brar, American actor
 January 25 – Jai Waetford, Australian singer
 February 7 – Bea Miller, American actress, singer, and songwriter
 February 8 – Alessia Russo, English footballer
 February 9
 Wang Manyu, Chinese table tennis player
 Henny Reistad, Norwegian handball player
 February 10 – Tiffany Espensen, Chinese-American actress
 February 11 – Andriy Lunin, Ukrainian footballer
 February 14 
 Tyler Adams, American soccer player
 Antonina Skorobogatchenko, Russian handball player
 February 20 – Lea van Acken, German actress
 February 21 – Metawin Opas-iamkajorn, Thai actor and singer
 February 25 – Gianluigi Donnarumma, Italian footballer
 February 28 – Luka Dončić, Slovenian basketball player

March–April

 March 5
 Madison Beer, American singer
 Yeri, South Korean singer
 March 6 – Abdul Hakim Sani Brown, Japanese athlete
 March 14 – Marvin Bagley III, American basketball player
 March 16 – Vladimir Guerrero Jr., Dominican-Canadian MLB player
 March 17 – Lorena Wiebes, Dutch racing cyclist
 March 19 – Jack Higgins, Australian rules footballer
 March 22 – Mick Schumacher, German racing driver
 March 24 – Arina Openysheva, Russian swimmer
 March 25 – Jin Ji-hee, South Korean actress
 April 4 – Sheku Kanneh-Mason, British cellist
 April 5 – Maria Astashkina, Russian swimmer
 April 9 – Lil Nas X, American rapper, singer, and songwriter
 April 11 – Karolina Bielawska, Polish model, television presenter, and beauty queen
 April 14
 Matteo Guendouzi, French footballer
 Chase Young, American football player
 April 15 – Denis Shapovalov, Canadian tennis player
 April 16 – Wendell Carter Jr., American basketball player
 April 18 – Michael Andrew, American swimmer
 April 19 – Corentin Moutet, French tennis player
 April 20 
 Fabio Quartararo, French Grand Prix motorcycle rider 
 Carly Rose Sonenclar, American actress and singer
 April 30 – Jorden van Foreest, Dutch chess grandmaster

May–June

 May 3 – Djamel Sedjati, Algerian middle distance runner
 May 5
 Justin Kluivert, Dutch footballer
 Nathan Chen, American figure skater
 May 8
 Maykel Massó, Cuban long jumper
 Rebeca Andrade, Brazilian artistic gymnast
 May 11 – Sabrina Carpenter, American actress, singer, and songwriter
 May 18 – Teo Halm, American actor and singer
 May 22 – Camren Bicondova, American actress and dancer
 May 24 – Charlie Plummer, American actor
 May 25
 Brec Bassinger, American actress
 Ibrahima Konaté, French footballer
 May 27
 Lily-Rose Depp, French-American actress and model
 Maria Kameneva, Russian swimmer
 May 30
 Sean Giambrone, American actor
 Zhou Guanyu, Chinese racing driver
 June 1 
 Dmitri Aliev, Russian figure skater
 Sofia Hublitz, American actress
 June 9 – Zane Smith, American professional truck car racing driver
 June 10 – Rafael Leão, Portuguese footballer
 June 11
 Kai Havertz, German footballer
 Saxon Sharbino, American actress
 June 14 – Tzuyu, Taiwanese singer
 June 17 – Elena Rybakina, Russian–Kazakh tennis player
 June 18 – Trippie Redd, American rapper
 June 21 – Natalie Alyn Lind, American actress
 June 24 – Mads Roerslev, Danish footballer
 June 27 – Chandler Riggs, American actor
 June 28 – Markéta Vondroušová, Czech tennis player
 June 29 – Nikita Volodin, Russian pair skater

July–August

 July 2 – Nicolò Zaniolo, Italian footballer
 July 4 – Moa Kikuchi, Japanese singer and dancer
 July 6 – Denis Khodykin, Russian pair skater
 July 10
 April Ivy, Portuguese singer and composer
 Matthew Real, Brazilian-American soccer player 
 July 12 – Nur Dhabitah Sabri, Malaysian diver
 July 13 – Leong Jun Hao, Malaysian badminton player
 July 15 – Seda Tutkhalyan, Russian artistic gymnast
 July 17 – Lisandro Cuxi, Portuguese-French singer
 July 19
 Pâmela Rosa, Brazilian skateboarder
 Kim So-hye, South Korean actress and singer
 July 20 
 Princess Alexandra of Hanover
 Ellie Downie, British artistic gymnast
 Pop Smoke, American rapper (d. 2020)
 July 28 – Keisuke Osako, Japanese footballer
 July 30 – Joey King, American actress
 August 2 – Emma Bale, Belgian singer
 August 3 – Yoo Yeon-jung, South Korean singer
 August 7 – Sydney McLaughlin, American hurdler and sprinter
 August 9 – Deniss Vasiļjevs, Latvian figure skater
 August 11 
 Kevin Knox, American basketball player
 Mary-Sophie Harvey, Canadian swimmer
 August 12 – Matthijs de Ligt, Dutch footballer
 August 16 – Karen Chen, American figure skater
 August 22 – Dakota Goyo, Canadian actor
 August 26 – Leonie Kullmann, German swimmer
 August 28 – Count Nikolai of Monpezat

September–October

 September 2 – Ella Toone, English footballer
 September 3 – Rich Brian, Indonesian rapper
 September 4 – Ellie Darcey-Alden, English actress
 September 5 – Alexey Erokhov, Russian figure skater
 September 7 – Michelle Creber, Canadian actress and singer
 September 8 – Shubman Gill, Indian cricketer
 September 13 – Ekaterina Borisova, Russian pair skater
 September 16 – Mao Yi, Chinese gymnast
 September 17 – Daniel Huttlestone, English actor
 September 21
 Alexander Isak, Swedish footballer
 Wang Junkai, Chinese singer
 September 22
 Kim Yoo-jung, South Korean actress
 Erin Pitt, Canadian actress
 September 30 – Flávia Saraiva, Brazilian artistic gymnast
 October 1 – Christopher Taylor, Jamaican sprinter
 October 14
 Wu Yibing, Chinese tennis player
 Laura Zeng, American rhythmic gymnast
 October 15
 Bailee Madison, American actress
 Alexei Sancov, Moldovan swimmer
 Ben Woodburn, British footballer
 October 17 – Gabrielle Fa'amausili, New Zealand swimmer
 October 19 – Carlotta Truman, German singer
 October 20 – YoungBoy Never Broke Again, American rapper
 October 27 – Amy Tinkler, British artistic gymnast
 October 30 – Wang Yan, Chinese gymnast

November–December

 November 9 – Karol Sevilla, Mexican actress and singer
 November 10
 Armand Duplantis, American-born Swedish pole vaulter
 João Félix, Portuguese footballer
 Kiernan Shipka, American actress
 November 11 – Fan Yilin, Chinese artistic gymnast
 November 12 – Choi Yoo-jung, South Korean singer and songwriter
 November 13 – Lando Norris, British racing driver
 November 19 – Evgenia Medvedeva, Russian figure skater
 November 26 – Olivia O'Brien, American singer
 December 4
 Kang Mi-na, South Korean singer and actress
 Kim Do-yeon, South Korean singer
 December 22 – Ameer Idreis, Canadian author
 December 29 – Nadine Joy Nathan, Singaporean artistic gymnast

Deaths

January

 January 4 – Iron Eyes Cody, Italian-American actor (b. 1904)
 January 6 – Michel Petrucciani, French jazz pianist and composer (b. 1962)
 January 11
 Teuvo Aura, Finnish politician, 33rd Prime Minister of Finland (b. 1912)
 Fabrizio De André, Italian singer and songwriter (b. 1940)
 Brian Moore, Northern Irish-Canadian writer (b. 1921)
 January 12 – Betty Lou Gerson, American actress (b. 1914)
 January 14 – Jerzy Grotowski, Polish theatre director (b. 1933)
 January 21 – Susan Strasberg, American actress (b. 1938)
 January 22 – Graham Staines, Australian missionary (b. 1941)
 January 23 – Joe D'Amato, Italian film director, producer, cinematographer, and screenwriter (b. 1936)
 January 25 – Robert Shaw, American conductor (b. 1916)

February

 February 1 – Barış Manço, Turkish singer and television personality (b. 1943)
 February 2 - Deborah Makepeace, English actress (b. 1957).
 February 5 – Wassily Leontief, Russian economist (b. 1906)
 February 7 
 King Hussein of Jordan (b. 1935)
 Bobby Troup, American actor, jazz pianist, singer and songwriter (b. 1918)
 February 8 – Dame Iris Murdoch, Anglo-Irish author (b. 1919)
 February 12 – Heinz Schubert, German actor and photographer (b. 1925)
 February 14
 Buddy Knox, American singer and songwriter (b. 1933)
 John Ehrlichman, American Watergate scandal figure (b. 1925)
 February 15
 Big L, American rapper (b. 1974)
 Henry Way Kendall, American physicist (b. 1926)
 February 16 – Björn Afzelius, Swedish singer, songwriter and guitarist (b. 1947)
 February 18 – Andreas Feininger, French-born photographer (b. 1906)
 February 20
 Sarah Kane, English playwright (b. 1971)
 Gene Siskel, American film critic (b. 1946)
 February 21 – Gertrude B. Elion, American biochemist and pharmacologist (b. 1918)
 February 25 – Glenn T. Seaborg, American chemist (b. 1912)
 February 28
 Bing Xin, Chinese author and poet (b. 1900)
 Bill Talbert, American tennis player (b. 1918)

March

 March 2 – Dusty Springfield, English pop singer (b. 1939)
 March 3
 Jackson C. Frank, American folk musician (b. 1943)
 Gerhard Herzberg, German-born chemist (b. 1904)
 March 4
 Harry Blackmun, American judge, Associate Justice of the Supreme Court (b. 1908)
 Fritz Honegger, Swiss politician, 79th President of Switzerland (b. 1917)
 March 5 – Richard Kiley, American actor (b. 1922)
 March 6
 Dennis Viollet, English footballer (b. 1933)
 Emir Isa bin Salman Al Khalifa of Bahrain (b. 1931)
 March 7 – Stanley Kubrick, American film director and producer (b. 1928)
 March 8
 Adolfo Bioy Casares, Argentine writer (b. 1914)
 Peggy Cass, American actress, comedian, and game show panelist (b. 1924)
 Joe DiMaggio, American baseball player (b. 1914)
 March 10 
 Oswaldo Guayasamín, Ecuadorian painter and sculptor (b. 1919)
 Kusumagraj, Indian poet, playwright and novelist (b. 1912)
 March 12 – Yehudi Menuhin, American violinist (b. 1916)
 March 13 – Garson Kanin, American playwright and screenwriter (b. 1912)
 March 14 – Kirk Alyn, American actor (b. 1910)
 March 17 
 Ernest Gold, Austrian-born composer (b. 1921)
 Humberto Fernández-Morán, Venezuelan research scientist (b. 1924)
 Hildegard Peplau, American nurse and theorist (b. 1909)
 March 19 – Tofilau Eti Alesana, Samoan politician, 6th Prime Minister of Samoa (b. 1924)
 March 21 
 Jean Guitton, French philosopher (b. 1901)
 Ernie Wise, English comedian (b. 1925)
 March 22 – David Strickland, American actor (b. 1969)
 March 24 – Gertrud Scholtz-Klink, German politician (b. 1902)
 March 29 – Joe Williams, American singer (b. 1918)
 March 30 – Igor Netto, Soviet–Russian footballer (b. 1930)
 March 31 – Yuri Knorozov, Russian linguist and epigrapher (b. 1922)

April

 April 4
 Faith Domergue, American actress (b. 1924)
 Jumabek Ibraimov, 5th Prime Minister of Kyrgyzstan (b. 1944)
 Bob Peck, English actor (b. 1945)
 April 9 – Ibrahim Baré Maïnassara, Nigerese military officer, 5th President of Niger (b. 1949)
 April 10 – Jean Vander Pyl, American actress (b. 1919)
 April 13 – Willi Stoph, German politician, 2-time Prime Minister of the German Democratic Republic (b. 1914)
 April 14
 Ellen Corby, American actress (b. 1911)
 Anthony Newley, English actor, singer and songwriter (b. 1931)
 April 15 – Harvey Postlethwaite, English engineer and race car designer (b. 1944)
 April 16 – Skip Spence, Canadian-American singer and songwriter (b. 1946)
 April 19 – Hermine Braunsteiner, German Nazi prison guard (b. 1919)
 April 20 
 Rick Rude, American professional wrestler (b. 1958)
 15 people (13 victims and 2 perpetrators) who died in the Columbine High School massacre
 April 21 – Charles "Buddy" Rogers, American actor (b. 1904)
 April 22 – Bert Remsen, American actor (b. 1925)
 April 25
 Michael Morris, Irish journalist and 6th President of the International Olympic Committee (b. 1914)
 Roger Troutman, American funk musician (b. 1951)
 April 26 – Jill Dando, British television journalist (b. 1961)
 April 27 – Al Hirt, American trumpeter and bandleader (b. 1922)
 April 28
 Rory Calhoun, American actor (b. 1922)
 Arthur Leonard Schawlow, American physicist (b. 1921)
 Alf Ramsey, English footballer and manager (b. 1920)

May

 May 2 – Oliver Reed, English actor (b. 1938)
 May 3 – Godfrey Evans, English cricketer (b. 1920)
 May 8
 Dana Plato, American actress (b. 1964)
 Dirk Bogarde, English actor (b. 1921)
 May 10 – Shel Silverstein, American author and poet (b. 1930)
 May 12 – Saul Steinberg, Romanian-born cartoonist (b. 1914)
 May 13 – Gene Sarazen, American golfer (b. 1902)
 May 17 – Henry Jones, American actor (b. 1912)
 May 18 – Betty Robinson, American athlete (b. 1911)
 May 19 – Candy Candido, American voice actor (b. 1913)
 May 21 – Vanessa Brown, Austrian-born American actress (b. 1928)
 May 23 – Owen Hart, Canadian professional wrestler (b. 1965)
 May 26 – Paul Sacher, Swiss conductor (b. 1906)

June

 June 1 – Christopher Cockerell, English engineer (b. 1910)
 June 5 – Mel Tormé, American singer (b. 1925)
 June 9 – Andrew L. Stone, American screenwriter, director and producer (b. 1902)
 June 11 – DeForest Kelley, American actor (b. 1920)
 June 12 – Sergey Khlebnikov, Soviet speed skater (b. 1955)
 June 16 – Screaming Lord Sutch, English politician (b. 1940)
 June 17
 Basil Hume, English cardinal (b. 1923)
 Paul-Émile de Souza, Beninese army officer and political figure (b. 1930)
 June 19
 Henri, Count of Paris, French nobleman (b. 1908)
 Mario Soldati, Italian writer and film director (b. 1906)
 June 25
 Fred Trump, American real estate developer (b. 1905)
 Yevgeny Morgunov, Soviet and Russian actor, film director, and script writer (b. 1927)
 June 27
 Siegfried Lowitz, German actor (b. 1914)
 Georgios Papadopoulos, 69th Prime Minister of Greece and 4th President of Greece (b. 1919)
 June 28 – Vere Bird, 1st Prime Minister of Antigua and Barbuda (b. 1910)
 June 30 – Édouard Boubat, French photojournalist and art photographer (b. 1923)

July

 July 1
 Dennis Brown, Jamaican reggae singer (b. 1957)
 Edward Dmytryk, American film director (b. 1908)
 Guy Mitchell, American singer (b. 1927)
 Joshua Nkomo, Zimbabwean politician (b. 1917)
 Sylvia Sidney, American actress (b. 1910)
 July 2 – Mario Puzo, American author (b. 1920)
 July 3 – Mark Sandman, American rock musician and artist (b. 1952)
 July 6 – Joaquín Rodrigo, Spanish composer (b. 1901)
 July 8
 Pete Conrad, American astronaut (b. 1930)
 Frank Lubin, Lithuanian-American basketball player (b. 1910)
 Shafik Wazzan, 27th Prime Minister of Lebanon (b. 1925)
 July 11 – Helen Forrest, American jazz singer (b. 1917)
 July 12 
 Rajendra Kumar, Indian film actor, producer and director (b. 1929)
 Bill Owen, English actor (b. 1914)
 July 14 
 Władysław Hasior, Polish sculptor (b. 1928)
 Gar Samuelson, American drummer (b. 1958)
 July 16 
 John F. Kennedy Jr., American lawyer, journalist, and magazine publisher (b. 1960)
 Carolyn Bessette-Kennedy, American actress and model (b. 1966)
 July 20 – Sandra Gould, American actress (b. 1916)
 July 21 – David Ogilvy, French Advertising executive (b. 1911)
 July 23 – King Hassan II of Morocco (b. 1929)
 July 26 – Trygve Haavelmo, Norwegian economist (b. 1911)
 July 27 
 Aleksandr Danilovich Aleksandrov, Soviet/Russian mathematician, physicist and philosopher (b. 1912)
 Phaedon Gizikis, Greek general, 5th President of Greece (b. 1917)
 July 29 – Anatoliy Solovianenko, Soviet operatic tenor (b. 1932)

August

 August 1 – Nirad C. Chaudhuri, Bengali writer (b. 1897)
 August 4 – Victor Mature, American actor (b. 1913)
 August 7 – Brion James, American actor (b. 1945)
 August 10 – Giuseppe Delfino, Italian fencer (b. 1921)
 August 11 – Henk Chin A Sen, 2nd Prime Minister of Suriname (b. 1934)
 August 13 – Jaime Garzón, Colombian journalist and comedian (b. 1960)
 August 14 – Pee Wee Reese, American baseball player (b. 1918)
 August 17 – Reiner Klimke, German equestrian (b. 1936)
 August 22 – Aleksandr Demyanenko, Russian film and theater actor (b. 1937)
 August 23 – James White, Irish writer (b. 1928)

September

 September 6 – Lagumot Harris, 3rd President of Nauru (b. 1938)
 September 8 – Moondog, American musician and composer (b. 1916)
 September 9 – Ruth Roman, American actress (b. 1922)
 September 10 – Alfredo Kraus, Spanish tenor (b. 1927)
 September 11 – Gonzalo Rodríguez, Uruguayan racing driver (b. 1972)
 September 12 – Allen Stack, American swimmer (b. 1928)
 September 14 – Charles Crichton, English film director (b. 1910)
 September 20 – Raisa Gorbacheva, Soviet first lady (b. 1932)
 September 22 – George C. Scott, American actor (b. 1927)
 September 24 – Ester Boserup, Danish economist (b. 1910)
 September 25 – Marion Zimmer Bradley, American writer (b. 1930)

October

 October 2 – Muhammad Nasiruddin al-Albani, Albanian Islamic scholar (b. 1914)
 October 3 – Akio Morita, Japanese businessman (b. 1921)
 October 4 
 Bernard Buffet, French painter (b. 1928)
 Art Farmer, American jazz trumpeter (b. 1928)
 October 6
 Gorilla Monsoon, American professional wrestler and announcer (b. 1937)
 Amália Rodrigues, Portuguese fado singer and actress (b. 1920)
 October 9
 Milt Jackson, American musician (b. 1923)
 Akhtar Hameed Khan, Pakistani businessman (b. 1914)
 October 11 – Galina Bystrova, Soviet athlete (b. 1934)
 October 12 – Wilt Chamberlain, American professional basketball player (b. 1936)
 October 14 – Julius Nyerere, 1st President of Tanzania (b. 1922)
 October 17 – Nicholas Metropolis, Greek-American physicist (b. 1915)
 October 19 – Nathalie Sarraute, Russian-born Francophone lawyer and writer (b. 1900)
 October 20 – Jack Lynch, Taoiseach of Ireland (b. 1917)
 October 21 – John Bromwich, Australian tennis player (b. 1918)
 October 23 – András Hegedüs, Hungarian politician, 45th Prime Minister of Hungary (b. 1922)
 October 24 – John Chafee, American politician (b. 1922)
 October 25 – Payne Stewart, American golfer (b. 1957)
 October 26
 Hoyt Axton, American singer and actor (b. 1938)
 Abraham Polonsky, American screenwriter and director (b. 1910)
 October 27
 Frank De Vol, American arranger, composer, and actor (b. 1911)
 Karen Demirchyan, Speaker of the National Assembly of Armenia (b. 1932)
 Robert Mills, American physicist (b. 1927)
 Leonard Petrosyan, 3rd Prime Minister of Artsakh (b. 1953)
 Vazgen Sargsyan, Armenian military commander and politician, 12th Prime Minister of Armenia (assassinated) (b. 1959)
 October 28 – Rafael Alberti, Spanish poet (b. 1902)
 October 31 – Greg Moore, Canadian race car driver (b. 1975)

November

 November 1
 Bhekimpi Dlamini, 4th Prime Minister of Swaziland (b. 1924)
 Theodore Hall, American physicist and spy (b. 1925)
 Walter Payton, American football player (b. 1954)
 November 2 – Demetrio B. Lakas, 27th President of Panama (b. 1925)
 November 3 – Ian Bannen, Scottish actor (b. 1928)
 November 8 – Leon Štukelj, Slovene gymnast (b. 1898)
 November 11
 Mary Kay Bergman, American voice actress (b. 1961)
 Vivian Fuchs, English geologist (b. 1908)
 Jacobo Timerman, Argentine journalist and author (b. 1923)
 November 12 – Mohammad Mohammadullah, 3rd President of Bangladesh (b. 1921)
 November 16 – Daniel Nathans, American microbiologist (b. 1928)
 November 18
 Paul Bowles, American novelist (b. 1910)
 Horst P. Horst, American photographer (b. 1906)
 Doug Sahm, American musician (b. 1941)
 November 20 – Amintore Fanfani, Italian politician, 32nd Prime Minister of Italy (b. 1908)
 November 21 – Quentin Crisp, English writer (b. 1908)

December

 December 1 – Fritz Fischer, German historian (b. 1908)
 December 2 – Charlie Byrd, American jazz musician and classical guitarist (b. 1925)
 December 3
 John Archer, American actor (b. 1915)
 Scatman John, American musician (b. 1942)
 Madeline Kahn, American actress, singer and comedian (b. 1942)
 December 4 – Nilde Iotti, Italian politician (b. 1920)
 December 5 – Nathan Jacobson, American mathematician (b. 1910)
 December 7 – Darling Légitimus, French actress (b. 1907)
 December 9 – Yakov Rylsky, Soviet sabre fencer (b. 1928)
 December 10
 Rick Danko, Canadian musician (b. 1943)
 Franjo Tuđman, 1st President of Croatia (b. 1922)
 December 12
 Paul Cadmus, American artist (b. 1904)
 Joseph Heller, American novelist (b. 1923)
 December 13 – Stane Dolanc, Yugoslav politician (b. 1925)
 December 17
 Rex Allen, American actor, singer, and songwriter (b. 1920)
 Jürgen Moser, German-American mathematician (b. 1928)
 Grover Washington Jr., American saxophonist (b. 1943)
 December 18 – Robert Bresson, French filmmaker (b. 1901)
 December 19 – Desmond Llewelyn, British actor (b. 1914)
 December 20
 Irving Rapper, American film director (b. 1898)
 Riccardo Freda, Italian film director (b. 1909)
 Hank Snow, Canadian-American country musician (b. 1914)
 December 23 
 John P. Davies, American diplomat (b. 1908)
 Wallace Diestelmeyer, Canadian skater (b. 1926)
 December 24
 Tito Guízar, Mexican singer and film actor (b. 1908)
 Bill Bowerman, American track and field coach, co-founder of Nike (b. 1911)
 Maurice Couve de Murville, 152nd Prime Minister of France (b. 1907)
 João Figueiredo, Brazilian military leader and politician, 30th President of Brazil (b. 1918)
 Grete Stern, German-Argentine photographer (b. 1904)
 December 26 
 Curtis Mayfield, American musician and composer (b. 1942)
 Shankar Dayal Sharma, 9th President of India (b. 1918)
 December 27 – Pierre Clémenti, French actor (b. 1942)
 December 28 – Clayton Moore, American actor (b. 1914)
 December 30
 Fritz Leonhardt, German structural engineer (b. 1909)
 Sarah Knauss, American supercentenarian (b. 1880)
 December 31 – Elliot Richardson, American politician and lawyer (b. 1920)

Nobel Prizes

 Physics – Gerardus 't Hooft and Martinus J. G. Veltman
 Chemistry – Ahmed H. Zewail
 Physiology or Medicine – Günter Blobel
 Literature – Günter Grass
 Peace – Médecins Sans Frontières
 Bank of Sweden Prize in Economic Sciences in Memory of Alfred Nobel – Robert Mundell

New English words and terms
 blog
 carbon footprint
 dashcam
 epigenomics
metabolomics
texting
 vape

References

External links